Isambard Kingdom Brunel  (9 April 1806 – 15 September 1859) was an English civil engineer and mechanical engineer, who is considered "one of the most ingenious and prolific figures in engineering history," "one of the 19th-century engineering giants", and "one of the greatest figures of the Industrial Revolution, [who] changed the face of the English landscape with his groundbreaking designs and ingenious constructions". Brunel built dockyards, the Great Western Railway (GWR), a series of steamships including the first purpose-built transatlantic steamship, and numerous important bridges and tunnels. His designs revolutionised public transport and modern engineering.

Though Brunel's projects were not always successful, they often contained innovative solutions to long-standing engineering problems.

On the GWR, Brunel set standards for a well-built railway, using careful surveys to minimise gradients and curves. This necessitated expensive construction techniques, new bridges, new viaducts, and the  Box Tunnel. He astonished Britain by proposing to extend the GWR westward to North America by building steam-powered, iron-hulled ships.

In 2002, Brunel was placed second in a BBC public poll to determine the "100 Greatest Britons." In 2006, the bicentenary of his birth, a major programme of events celebrated his life and work under the name Brunel 200.

Early life 
Isambard Kingdom Brunel was born on 9 April 1806 in Britain Street, Portsea, Portsmouth, Hampshire, where his father was working on block-making machinery. He was named Isambard after his father, the French civil engineer Sir Marc Isambard Brunel, and Kingdom after his English mother, Sophia Kingdom.
 
He had two elder sisters, Sophia, the eldest child, and Emma. The whole family moved to London in 1808 for his father's work. Brunel had a happy childhood, despite the family's constant money worries, with his father acting as his teacher during his early years. His father taught him drawing and observational techniques from the age of four, and Brunel had learned Euclidean geometry by eight. During this time, he also learned to speak French fluently and the basic principles of engineering. He was encouraged to draw interesting buildings and identify any faults in their structure.

When Brunel was eight, he was sent to Dr Morrell's boarding school in Hove, where he learned classics. His father, a Frenchman by birth, was determined that Brunel should have access to the high-quality education he had enjoyed in his youth in France; accordingly, at the age of 14, the younger Brunel was enrolled first at the University of Caen, then at Lycée Henri-IV in Paris.

When Brunel was 15, his father, who had accumulated debts of over £5,000, was sent to a debtors' prison. After three months went by with no prospect of release, Marc Brunel let it be known that he was considering an offer from the Tsar of Russia. In August 1821, facing the prospect of losing a prominent engineer, the government relented and issued Marc £5,000 to clear his debts in exchange for his promise to remain in Britain.

When Brunel completed his studies at Henri-IV in 1822, his father had him presented as a candidate at the renowned engineering school École Polytechnique, but as a foreigner, he was deemed ineligible for entry. Brunel subsequently studied under the prominent master clockmaker and horologist Abraham-Louis Breguet, who praised Brunel's potential in letters to his father. In late 1822, having completed his apprenticeship, Brunel returned to England.

Thames Tunnel

Brunel worked for several years as an assistant engineer on the project to create a tunnel under London's River Thames between Rotherhithe and Wapping, with tunnellers driving a horizontal shaft from one side of the river to the other under the most difficult and dangerous conditions. The project was funded by the Thames Tunnel Company and Brunel's father, Marc, was the chief engineer. The American Naturalist said "It is stated also that the operations of the Teredo [Shipworm] suggested to Mr. Brunel his method of tunnelling the Thames."

The composition of the riverbed at Rotherhithe was often little more than waterlogged sediment and loose gravel. An ingenious tunnelling shield designed by Marc Brunel helped protect workers from cave-ins, but two incidents of severe flooding halted work for long periods, killing several workers and badly injuring the younger Brunel. The latter incident, in 1828, killed the two most senior miners, and Brunel himself narrowly escaped death. He was seriously injured and spent six months recuperating, during which time he began a design for a bridge in Bristol, which would later be completed as the Clifton Suspension Bridge. The event stopped work on the tunnel for several years.

Though the Thames Tunnel was eventually completed during Marc Brunel's lifetime, his son had no further involvement with the tunnel proper, only using the abandoned works at Rotherhithe to further his abortive Gaz experiments. This was based on an idea of his father's and was intended to develop into an engine that ran on power generated from alternately heating and cooling carbon dioxide made from ammonium carbonate and sulphuric acid. Despite interest from several parties (the Admiralty included) the experiments were judged by Brunel to be a failure on the grounds of fuel economy alone, and were discontinued after 1834.

In 1865, the East London Railway Company purchased the Thames Tunnel for £200,000, and four years later the first trains passed through it. Subsequently, the tunnel became part of the London Underground system, and remains in use today, originally as part of the East London Line now incorporated into the London Overground.

Bridges

Brunel is perhaps best remembered for designs for the Clifton Suspension Bridge in Bristol, begun in 1831. The bridge was built to designs based on Brunel's, but with significant changes. Brunel submitted four designs to a committee headed by Thomas Telford, but Telford rejected all entries, proposing his own design instead. Vociferous opposition from the public forced the organising committee to hold a new competition, which was won by Brunel.

Afterwards, Brunel wrote to his brother-in-law, the politician Benjamin Hawes: "Of all the wonderful feats I have performed, since I have been in this part of the world, I think yesterday I performed the most wonderful. I produced unanimity among 15 men who were all quarrelling about that most ticklish subject—taste".

Work on the Clifton bridge started in 1831, but was suspended due to the Queen Square riots caused by the arrival of Sir Charles Wetherell in Clifton. The riots drove away investors, leaving no money for the project, and construction ceased.

Brunel did not live to see the bridge finished, although his colleagues and admirers at the Institution of Civil Engineers felt it would be a fitting memorial, and started to raise new funds and to amend the design. Work recommenced in 1862, three years after Brunel's death, and was completed in 1864. In 2011, it was suggested, by historian and biographer Adrian Vaughan, that Brunel did not design the bridge, as eventually built, as the later changes to its design were substantial. His views reflected a sentiment stated fifty-two years earlier by Tom Rolt in his 1959 book Brunel. Re-engineering of suspension chains recovered from an earlier suspension bridge was one of many reasons given why Brunel's design could not be followed exactly.

Hungerford Bridge, a suspension footbridge across the Thames near Charing Cross Station in London, was opened in May 1845. It was replaced by a new railway bridge in 1859, and the suspension chains were used to complete the Clifton Suspension Bridge.

The Clifton Suspension Bridge still stands, and over 4 million vehicles traverse it every year.

Brunel designed many bridges for his railway projects, including the Royal Albert Bridge spanning the River Tamar at Saltash near Plymouth, Somerset Bridge (an unusual laminated timber-framed bridge near Bridgwater), the Windsor Railway Bridge, and the Maidenhead Railway Bridge over the Thames in Berkshire. This last was the flattest, widest brick arch bridge in the world and is still carrying main line trains to the west, even though today's trains are about ten times heavier than in Brunel's time.

Throughout his railway building career, but particularly on the South Devon and Cornwall Railways where economy was needed and there were many valleys to cross, Brunel made extensive use of wood for the construction of substantial viaducts; these have had to be replaced over the years as their primary material, Kyanised Baltic Pine, became uneconomical to obtain.

Brunel designed the Royal Albert Bridge in 1855 for the Cornwall Railway, after Parliament rejected his original plan for a train ferry across the Hamoaze—the estuary of the tidal Tamar, Tavy and Lynher. Opened by Prince Albert on 2 May 1859, it was completed in the year of Brunel's death.

Several of Brunel's bridges over the Great Western Railway might be demolished because the line is to be electrified, and there is inadequate clearance for overhead wires. Buckinghamshire County Council is negotiating to have further options pursued, in order that all nine of the remaining historic bridges on the line can be saved.

Brunel's last major undertaking was the unique Three Bridges, London. Work began in 1856, and was completed in 1859.

The three bridges in question are a clever arrangement allowing the routes of the Grand Junction Canal, Great Western and Brentford Railway, and Windmill Lane to cross each other.

Great Western Railway

In the early part of Brunel's life, the use of railways began to take off as a major means of transport for goods. This influenced Brunel's involvement in railway engineering, including railway bridge engineering.

In 1833, before the Thames Tunnel was complete, Brunel was appointed chief engineer of the Great Western Railway, one of the wonders of Victorian Britain, running from London to Bristol and later Exeter. The company was founded at a public meeting in Bristol in 1833, and was incorporated by Act of Parliament in 1835.
It was Brunel's vision that passengers would be able to purchase one ticket at London Paddington and travel from London to New York, changing from the Great Western Railway to the Great Western steamship at the terminus in Neyland, West Wales. He surveyed the entire length of the route between London and Bristol himself, with the help of many including his solicitor Jeremiah Osborne of Bristol Law Firm Osborne Clarke who on one occasion rowed Brunel down the River Avon himself to survey the bank of the river for the route. Brunel even designed the Royal Hotel in Bath which opened in 1846 opposite the railway station.

His decision to use broad gauge for the line was controversial in that almost all British railways to date had used standard gauge. Brunel said that this was nothing more than a carry-over from the mine railways that George Stephenson had worked on prior to making the world's first passenger railway. Brunel proved through both calculation and a series of trials that his broader gauge was the optimum size for providing both higher speeds and a stable and comfortable ride to passengers. In addition the wider gauge allowed for larger goods wagons and thus greater freight capacity.

Drawing on Brunel's experience with the Thames Tunnel, the Great Western contained a series of impressive achievements—soaring viaducts such as the one in Ivybridge, specially designed stations, and vast tunnels including the Box Tunnel, which was the longest railway tunnel in the world at that time. There is an anecdote claiming that the Box Tunnel was deliberately aligned so that the rising sun shines all the way through it on Brunel's birthday. With the opening of the Box Tunnel, the line from London to Bristol was complete and ready for trains on 30 June 1841.

The initial group of locomotives ordered by Brunel to his own specifications proved unsatisfactory, apart from the North Star locomotive, and 20-year-old Daniel Gooch (later Sir Daniel) was appointed as Superintendent of Locomotive Engines. Brunel and Gooch chose to locate their locomotive works at the village of Swindon, at the point where the gradual ascent from London turned into the steeper descent to the Avon valley at Bath.

Brunel's achievements ignited the imagination of the technically minded Britons of the age, and he soon became quite notable in the country on the back of this interest.

After Brunel's death, the decision was taken that standard gauge should be used for all railways in the country. At the original Welsh terminus of the Great Western railway at Neyland, sections of the broad gauge rails are used as handrails at the quayside, and information boards there depict various aspects of Brunel's life. There is also a larger-than-life bronze statue of him holding a steamship in one hand and a locomotive in the other. The statue has been replaced after an earlier theft.

The present London Paddington station was designed by Brunel and opened in 1854. Examples of his designs for smaller stations on the Great Western and associated lines which survive in good condition include Mortimer, Charlbury and Bridgend (all Italianate) and Culham (Tudorbethan). Surviving examples of wooden train sheds in his style are at Frome and Kingswear.

The Swindon Steam Railway Museum has many artefacts from Brunel's time on the Great Western Railway. The Didcot Railway Centre has a reconstructed segment of  track as designed by Brunel and working steam locomotives in the same gauge.

Parts of society viewed the railways more negatively. Some landowners felt the railways were a threat to amenities or property values and others requested tunnels on their land so the railway could not be seen.

Brunel's "atmospheric caper"

Though unsuccessful, another of Brunel's interesting use of technical innovations was the atmospheric railway, the extension of the Great Western Railway (GWR) southward from Exeter towards Plymouth, technically the South Devon Railway (SDR), though supported by the GWR. Instead of using locomotives, the trains were moved by Clegg and Samuda's patented system of atmospheric (vacuum) traction, whereby stationary pumps sucked the air from a pipe placed in the centre of the track.

Pumping stations with distinctive square chimneys were sited at two-mile intervals. Fifteen-inch (381 mm) pipes were used on the level portions, and  pipes were intended for the steeper gradients.

The technology required the use of leather flaps to seal the vacuum pipes. The natural oils were drawn out of the leather by the vacuum, making the leather vulnerable to water, rotting it and breaking the fibres when it froze during the winter of 1847. It had to be kept supple with tallow, which is attractive to rats. The flaps were eaten, and vacuum operation lasted less than a year, from 1847 (experimental service began in September; operations from February 1848) to 10 September 1848. Deterioration of the valve due to the reaction of tannin and iron oxide has been cited as the last straw that sank the project, as the continuous valve began to tear from its rivets over most of its length, and the estimated replacement cost of £25,000 was considered prohibitive.

The system never managed to prove itself. The accounts of the SDR for 1848 suggest that atmospheric traction cost 3s 1d (three shillings and one penny) per mile compared to 1s 4d/mile for conventional steam power (because of the many operating issues associated with the atmospheric, few of which were solved during its working life, the actual cost efficiency proved impossible to calculate). Several South Devon Railway engine houses still stand, including that at Totnes (scheduled as a grade II listed monument in 2007) and at Starcross.

A section of the pipe, without the leather covers, is preserved at the Didcot Railway Centre.

In 2017, inventor Max Schlienger unveiled a working model of an updated atmospheric railroad at his vineyard in the Northern California town of Ukiah.

Transatlantic shipping

Brunel had proposed extending its transport network by boat from Bristol across the Atlantic Ocean to New York City before the Great Western Railway opened in 1835. The Great Western Steamship Company was formed by Thomas Guppy for that purpose. It was widely disputed whether it would be commercially viable for a ship powered purely by steam to make such long journeys. Technological developments in the early 1830s—including the invention of the surface condenser, which allowed boilers to run on salt water without stopping to be cleaned—made longer journeys more possible, but it was generally thought that a ship would not be able to carry enough fuel for the trip and have room for commercial cargo. Brunel applied the experimental evidence of Beaufoy and further developed the theory that the amount a ship could carry increased as the cube of its dimensions, whereas the amount of resistance a ship experienced from the water as it travelled increased by only a square of its dimensions. This would mean that moving a larger ship would take proportionately less fuel than a smaller ship.

The ship was constructed mainly from wood, but Brunel added bolts and iron diagonal reinforcements to maintain the keel's strength. In addition to its steam-powered paddle wheels, the ship carried four masts for sails. Brunel himself missed this initial crossing, having been injured during a fire aboard the ship as she was returning from fitting out in London. As the fire delayed the launch several days, the Great Western missed its opportunity to claim the title as the first ship to cross the Atlantic under steam power alone. Even with a four-day head start, the competing  arrived only one day earlier, having virtually exhausted its coal supply. In contrast, the Great Western crossing of the Atlantic took 15 days and five hours, and the ship arrived at her destination with a third of its coal still remaining, demonstrating that Brunel's calculations were correct. The Great Western had proved the viability of commercial transatlantic steamship service, which led the Great Western Steamboat Company to use her in regular service between Bristol and New York from 1838 to 1846. She made 64 crossings, and was the first ship to hold the Blue Riband with a crossing time of 13 days westbound and 12 days 6 hours eastbound. The service was commercially successful enough for a sister ship to be required, which Brunel was asked to design.

Brunel had become convinced of the superiority of propeller-driven ships over paddle wheels. Great Britain is considered the first modern ship, being built of metal rather than wood, powered by an engine rather than wind or oars, and driven by propeller rather than paddle wheel. She was the first iron-hulled, propeller-driven ship to cross the Atlantic Ocean. Her maiden voyage was made in August and September 1845, from Liverpool to New York. In 1846, she was run aground at Dundrum, County Down. She was salvaged and employed in the Australian service. She is currently fully preserved and open to the public in Bristol, UK.

In 1852 Brunel turned to a third ship, larger than her predecessors, intended for voyages to India and Australia. Great Eastern was designed to cruise non-stop from London to Sydney and back (since engineers of the time mistakenly believed that Australia had no coal reserves), and she remained the largest ship built until the start of the 20th century. Like many of Brunel's ambitious projects, the ship soon ran over budget and behind schedule in the face of a series of technical problems. The ship has been portrayed as a white elephant, but it has been argued by David P. Billington that in this case, Brunel's failure was principally one of economics—his ships were simply years ahead of their time. His vision and engineering innovations made the building of large-scale, propeller-driven, all-metal steamships a practical reality, but the prevailing economic and industrial conditions meant that it would be several decades before transoceanic steamship travel emerged as a viable industry.

Great Eastern was built at John Scott Russell's Napier Yard in London, and after two trial trips in 1859, set forth on her maiden voyage from Southampton to New York on 17 June 1860. Though a failure at her original purpose of passenger travel, she eventually found a role as an oceanic telegraph cable-layer. Under Captain Sir James Anderson, the Great Eastern played a significant role in laying the first lasting transatlantic telegraph cable, which enabled telecommunication between Europe and North America.

Renkioi Hospital

Britain entered into the Crimean War during 1854 and an old Turkish barracks became the British Army Hospital in Scutari. Injured men contracted a variety of illnesses—including cholera, dysentery, typhoid and malaria—due to poor conditions there, and Florence Nightingale sent a plea to The Times for the government to produce a solution.

Brunel was working on the Great Eastern amongst other projects but accepted the task in February 1855 of designing and building the War Office requirement of a temporary, pre-fabricated hospital that could be shipped to Crimea and erected there. In five months the team he had assembled designed, built, and shipped pre-fabricated wood and canvas buildings, providing them complete with advice on transportation and positioning of the facilities.

Brunel had been working with Gloucester Docks-based William Eassie on the launching stage for the Great Eastern. Eassie had designed and built wooden prefabricated huts used in both the Australian gold rush, as well as by the British and French Armies in the Crimea. Using wood supplied by timber importers Price & Co., Eassie fabricated 18 of the 50-patient wards designed by Brunel, shipped directly via 16 ships from Gloucester Docks to the Dardanelles. The Renkioi Hospital was subsequently erected near Scutari Hospital, where Nightingale was based, in the malaria-free area of Renkioi.

His designs incorporated the necessities of hygiene: access to sanitation, ventilation, drainage, and even rudimentary temperature controls. They were feted as a great success, with some sources stating that of the approximately 1,300 patients treated in the hospital, there were only 50 deaths. In the Scutari hospital it replaced, deaths were said to be as many as ten times this number. Nightingale referred to them as "those magnificent huts". The practice of building hospitals from pre-fabricated modules survives today, with hospitals such as the Bristol Royal Infirmary being created in this manner.

Personal life
On 10 June 1830 Brunel was elected a Fellow of the Royal Society.

Brunel married Mary Elizabeth Horsley (b. 1813) on 5 July 1836. She came from an accomplished musical and artistic family, being the eldest daughter of composer and organist William Horsley. They established a home at Duke Street, Westminster, in London.

While performing a conjuring trick for the amusement of his children in 1843 Brunel accidentally inhaled a half-sovereign coin, which became lodged in his windpipe. A special pair of forceps failed to remove it, as did a machine devised by Brunel to shake it loose. At the suggestion of his father, Brunel was strapped to a board and turned upside-down, and the coin was jerked free. He recuperated at Teignmouth, and enjoyed the area so much that he purchased an estate at Watcombe in Torquay, Devon. Here he commissioned William Burn to design Brunel Manor and its gardens to be his country home. He never saw the house or gardens finished as he died before it was completed.

Brunel, a heavy smoker, who had been diagnosed with Bright's disease (nephritis), suffered a stroke on 5 September 1859, just before the Great Eastern made her first voyage to New York. He died ten days later at the age of 53 and was buried, like his father, in Kensal Green Cemetery, London. He is commemorated at Westminster Abbey in a window on the south side of the nave. Many mourned Brunel's passing, in spite and because of his business ventures; an obituary in The Morning Chronicle noted:

Brunel was the right man for the nation, but unfortunately, he was not the right man for the shareholders. They must stoop who must gather gold, and Brunel could never stoop. The history of invention records no instance of grand novelties so boldly imagined and so successfully carried out by the same individual.

Brunel was survived by his wife, Mary, and three children: Isambard Brunel Junior (1837–1902), Henry Marc Brunel (1842–1903) and Florence Mary Brunel (1847–1876). Henry Marc later became a successful civil engineer.

Legacy

A celebrated engineer in his era, Brunel remains revered today, as evidenced by numerous monuments to him. There are statues in London at Temple (pictured), Brunel University and Paddington station, and in Bristol, Plymouth, Swindon, Milford Haven and Saltash. A statue in Neyland in Pembrokeshire in Wales was stolen in August 2010. The topmast of the Great Eastern is used as a flagpole at the entrance to Anfield, Liverpool Football Club's ground. Contemporary locations bear Brunel's name, such as Brunel University in London, shopping centres in Swindon and also Bletchley, Milton Keynes, and a collection of streets in Exeter: Isambard Terrace, Kingdom Mews, and Brunel Close. A road, car park, and school in his home city of Portsmouth are also named in his honour, along with one of the city's largest public houses. There is an engineering lab building at the University of Plymouth named in his honour.

A public poll conducted by the BBC in 2001 to select the 100 Greatest Britons, Brunel was placed second, behind Winston Churchill. Brunel's life and works have been depicted in numerous books, films and television programs. The 2003 book and BBC TV series Seven Wonders of the Industrial World included a dramatisation of the building of the Great Eastern.

Many of Brunel's bridges are still in use. Brunel's first engineering project, the Thames Tunnel, is now part of the London Overground network. The Brunel Engine House at Rotherhithe, which once housed the steam engines that powered the tunnel pumps, now houses the Brunel Museum dedicated to the work and lives of Henry Marc and Isambard Kingdom Brunel.

Brunel is credited with turning the town of Swindon into one of the fastest-growing towns in Europe during the 19th century. Brunel's choice to locate the Great Western Railway locomotive sheds there caused a need for housing for the workers, which in turn gave Brunel the impetus to build hospitals, churches and housing estates in what is known today as the 'Railway Village'. According to some sources, Brunel's addition of a Mechanics Institute for recreation and hospitals and clinics for his workers gave Aneurin Bevan the basis for the creation of the National Health Service. 

GWR Castle Class steam locomotive no. 5069 was named Isambard Kingdom Brunel, after the engineer; and BR Western Region class 47 diesel locomotive no. D1662 (later 47484) was also named Isambard Kingdom Brunel. GWR's successor Great Western Railway has named both its old InterCity 125 power car 43003 and new InterCity Electric Train 800004 as Isambard Kingdom Brunel.

The Royal Mint struck two £2 coins in 2006 to "celebrate the 200th anniversary of Isambard Kingdom Brunel and his achievements". The first depicts Brunel with a section of the Royal Albert Bridge and the second shows the roof of Paddington Station. In the same year the Post Office issued a set of six wide commemorative stamps (SG 2607-12) showing the Royal Albert Bridge, the Box Tunnel, Paddington Station, the Great Eastern, the Clifton Suspension Bridge, and the Maidenhead Bridge.

The words "I.K. BRUNEL ENGINEER 1859" were fixed to either end of the Royal Albert Bridge to commemorate his death in 1859, the year the bridge opened. The words were later partly obscured by maintenance access ladders but were revealed again by Network Rail in 2006 to honour his bicentenary.

Brunel was the subject of Great, a 1975 animated film directed by Bob Godfrey. It won the Academy Award for Best Animated Short Film at the 48th Academy Awards in March 1976.

At the 2012 Summer Olympics opening ceremony, Brunel was portrayed by Kenneth Branagh in a segment showing the Industrial Revolution.

Brunel is a central character in Howard Rodman's novel The Great Eastern, published in 2019 by Melville House Publishing.

See also

 Lindsey House – Brunel's childhood home
 Two Tunnel Boring Machines (TBMs) used by Crossrail were named for Brunel's wife Mary and his mother Sophia.

Notes

References

  Only the first of a planned three volumes was published
 
 
  (This is Isambard Brunel Junior, IKB's son.)
 
 
 
 
 
 
 
 
  (373 pages) Online at Internet Archive

Further reading

  Written by Brunel's son
  Written by Brunel's granddaughter, it adds some family anecdotes and personal information over the previous volume
  A technical presentation of Brunel's opus
  A study of how early photography portrayed Victorian industry and engineering, including the celebrated picture of Brunel and the launching chains of the Great Eastern

External links

 The life of Isambard Kingdom Brunel, Civil Engineer by Isambard Brunel Junior, at Project Gutenberg
 
  The Times 19 September 1859
 Brunel biography with additional images from the Design Museum
 
 Brunel portal
 
 
 

1806 births
1859 deaths
 
English civil engineers
British bridge engineers
British railway pioneers
19th-century British inventors
People of the Industrial Revolution
British naval architects
British railway civil engineers
Structural engineers
Viaduct engineers
Architectural designers
.
Fellows of the Royal Society
01
.
People from Portsea, Portsmouth
Engineers from Portsmouth
English people of French descent
Lycée Henri-IV alumni
Burials at Kensal Green Cemetery
Deaths from nephritis
Great Western Railway
19th-century British engineers
19th-century English architects
Architects from Portsmouth
Businesspeople from Portsmouth